This article lists the most expensive music videos ever made, with costs of $500,000 or more.

David Bowie's video for the 1980 single "Ashes to Ashes" was the first music video to exceed this sum. Janet Jackson leads with six videos on the list, while Michael Jackson, Britney Spears and Ayumi Hamasaki have five each. Madonna has made three appearances in the top five, and four total, making her the artist with the most expensive videos of all time combined. TLC, Mariah Carey, Kanye West, Busta Rhymes, Guns N' Roses, Mylène Farmer and MC Hammer appear on the list twice.

Joseph Kahn has directed seven, while Hype Williams, Cha Eun Taek, Paul Hunter, Wataru Takeishi have directed three. Nigel Dick, Mark Romanek and John Landis appear twice, the latter with videos both for Michael Jackson. This list only includes music videos with an announced or reported budget.

Romanek, who made Michael and Janet Jackson's "Scream", which was claimed to be one of the most expensive music videos ever made, has since denied this claim, saying that there were two other music videos from the same era which cost "millions more" than "Scream". In a 2017 interview, Mick Garris, a writer for Michael Jackson's Ghosts stated that after several years of production development for the Ghosts short film: "It became the most expensive music video ever made...it ended up coming in at about $15 million, all of it out of Michael's pocket."

In 2013 astronaut Chris Hadfield recorded himself singing David Bowie's "Space Oddity" while onboard the International Space Station| (ISS). Hadfield later uploaded the video to YouTube. The video had hundreds of millions of views, but was taken down from YouTube (though copies remain). The cost of sending Hadfield and his guitar to the ISS was estimated to be in excess of $20,000,000 (the price paid by Dennis Tito to Russia for his trip to the ISS). This would technically make Hadfield's the most expensive music video of all time.

Most expensive music videos

Timeline

See also 
 Vevo Certified Award

Notes

References

Citations

Print sources 

Lists of music videos
Music Videos